H. C. Venugopal is an Indian cinematographer, who has worked in the Kannada and Tamil film industries.

Career
H. C. Venugopal is a cinematographer who has predominantly worked for Kannada films. He has been active since the late 1990s, regularly collaborating for high-profile Kannada films including A (1998), Sparsha (1999), H2O (2002), Aa Dinagalu (2007),  Jaggu Dada (2016) to name a few. He was also involved in the shoot of the first 3D Kannada film Katari Veera Surasundarangi (2012)  .

In recent years, he has collaborated with Arjun Sarja for the bilingual films, Jaihind 2 (2014) and Prema Baraha (2018).

Personal life
Venugopal married actress-politician Tara in 2005. They have a son named Shreekrishna (b. 2013) together.

Selected filmography

As cinematographer

 A (1998)
 Sparsha (1999)
 Prathyartha (1999)
 Dhumm (2002)
 Marma (2002)
 H2O (2002)
 Parva (2002)
 Maharaja (2005)
 Kallarali Hoovagi (2006)
 Neenello Naanalle (2006)
 Aa Dinagalu (2007)
 Ugadi (2007)
 Anthu Inthu Preethi Banthu (2008)
 Birugaali (2009)
 Modalasala (2010)
 Suryakaanti (2010)
 Rajadhani (2011)
 Chingari (2012)
 Katari Veera Surasundarangi (2012)
 Nam Duniya Nam Style (2013)
 Jaihind 2 / Abhimanyu (2014)
 Dil Rangeela (2014)
 RX Soori (2015)
 Jaggu Dada (2016)
 Mummy (2016)
 Nagarahavu (2016)
 Prema Baraha / Solli Vidava (2018)
 Shivarjuna (2020)

References

External links
 

Living people
Cinematographers from Karnataka
Kannada film cinematographers
Tamil film cinematographers
Year of birth missing (living people)